Kosmos 665 ( meaning Cosmos 665) was a Soviet US-K missile early warning satellite which was launched in 1974 as part of the Soviet military's Oko programme. The satellite was designed to identify missile launches using optical telescopes and infrared sensors.

Kosmos 665 was launched from Site 41/1 at Plesetsk Cosmodrome in the Russian SSR. A Molniya-M carrier rocket with a 2BL upper stage was used to perform the launch, which took place at 15:59 UTC on 29 June 1974. The launch successfully placed the satellite into a molniya orbit. It subsequently received its Kosmos designation, and the international designator 1974-050A. The United States Space Command assigned it the Satellite Catalog Number 7352.

It re-entered the Earth's atmosphere on 6 July 1990.

See also

 List of Kosmos satellites (501–750)
 List of R-7 launches (1970–1974)
 1974 in spaceflight
 List of Oko satellites

References

Kosmos satellites
1974 in spaceflight
Oko
Spacecraft launched by Molniya-M rockets
Spacecraft which reentered in 1990
Spacecraft launched in 1974